The following is the complete filmography of American actress, director, writer, and producer Elizabeth Banks.

Film

Executive producer
 Surrogates (2009)

Acting roles

Short film
Director

Executive producer
 Yours Sincerely, Lois Weber (2017) (Documentary short)

Acting credits

Television

Acting credits

Executive producer

Video games

Music videos

Theme park attractions

References

External links
 

Filmography
Banks, Elizabeth
Banks, Elizabeth